The Society of Scribes & Illuminators is an organisation dedicated to the promotion and development of the arts of calligraphy and illumination.

The SSI was founded in the United Kingdom in 1921 by former students of leading calligrapher Edward Johnston and has an international reputation in its field. The SSI organises exhibitions and lectures on subjects related to its fields of interest. Membership is opened to professionals in the field as well as interested amateurs. Members who have reached a particularly high standard of work may be elected as Fellows of the Society, and are entitled (provided their subscription has not lapsed) to use the post-nominal FSSI.

Fellows 

 Tom Gourdie
 Donald Jackson (calligrapher)
 Dorothy Miner
 Brody Neuenschwander
 Charles Pearce
 Mildred Ratcliffe
 Sheila Waters
 Irene Wellington
 Mary White
 Anthony Wood

See also
Scribe
:Category:Fellows of the Society of Scribes and Illuminators

References

External links
Society of Scribes & Illuminators

1921 establishments in the United Kingdom
Arts organizations established in 1921
Calligraphy organizations, societies, and schools
Learned societies of the United Kingdom
Manuscript illuminators